Ibrahim Mustapha may refer to:
 Ibrahim Mustapha (Nigerian footballer) (born 1996)
 Ibrahim Mustapha (Ghanaian footballer) (born 2000)